The Cambridgeshire and Peterborough Police and Crime Commissioner is the police and crime commissioner, an elected official tasked with setting out the way crime is tackled by Cambridgeshire Police in the English County of Cambridgeshire. The post was created in November 2012, following an election held on 15 November 2012, and replaced the Cambridgeshire Police Authority. 

The post was filled by Sir Graham Bright from 2012 to 2016, then by Jason Ablewhite, both of whom represented the Conservative Party. On 11 November 2019, Ablewhite resigned as Police and Crime Commissioner following his referral to the Independent Office for Police Conduct after a complaint from a member of the public alleging that Ablewhite had sent her unsolicited indecent photographs of himself via social media. He was succeeded by his deputy, Peterborough councillor Ray Bisby until the next Police and Crime Commissioner elections in May 2021 (postponed from May 2020 due to Covid-19).

List of Cambridgeshire Police and Crime Commissioners

Elections

See also
Mayor of Cambridgeshire and Peterborough

References

External links

Police and crime commissioners in England